The Bellavista Province is one of ten provinces of the San Martín Region in northern Peru.

Political division
The province is divided into six districts.
 Alto Biavo (Cuzco)
 Bajo Biavo (Nuevo Lima)
 Bellavista (Bellavista)
 Huallaga (Ledoy)
 San Pablo (San Pablo)
 San Rafael (San Rafael)

Provinces of the San Martín Region